The La Pedrera de Rúbies Formation is an Early Cretaceous (late Berriasian to early Barremian geologic formation in Catalonia, Spain. The formation crops out in the area of the Montsec in the Organyà Basin. At the La Pedrera de Meià locality, the formation consists of rhythmically laminated, lithographic limestones that formed in the distal areas of a large, shallow coastal lake. It is noted for the exceptional preservation of articulated small vertebrates and insects, similar to that of the Solnhofen Limestone.

Fossil content 
The La Pedrera de Rúbies Formation has yielded the enantiornithine bird Noguerornis and the scincogekkomorph lizard Pedrerasaurus, and two species of Teiid lizard Meyasaurus, M. fauri and M. crusafonti, the indeterminate avialan Ilerdopteryx, frogs Neusibatrachus wilferti, and Montsechobatrachus. A crocodyliform Montsecosuchus  and many insects and other arthropods, as:

 Angarosphex lithographicu
 Archisphex catalunicus
 Artitocoblatta hispanica
 Chalicoridulum montsecensis
 Chrysobothris ballae
 Cionocoleus longicapitis
 Condalia woottoni
 Cretephialtites pedrerae
 Hirmoneura (Eohirmoneura) neli
 Hirmoneura richterae
 Iberoraphidia dividua
 Ilerdocossus pulcherrima
 Ilerdosphex wenzae
 Jarzembowskia edmundi
 Leridatoma pulcherrima
 Manlaya lacabrua
 Meiagaster cretaceus
 Meiatermes bertrani
 Mesoblattina colominasi
 Mesopalingea lerida
 Mimamontsecia cretacea
 Montsecbelus solutus
 Nanoraphidia lithographica
 Nogueroblatta fontllongae
 N. nana
 Pachypsyche vidali
 Pompilopterus montsecensis
 Proraphidia gomezi
 Prosyntexis montsecensis
 Pseudochrysobothris ballae
 Ptiolinites almuthae
 Vitisma occidentalis
 Cretaholocompsa montsecana
 Montsecosphex jarzembowskii
 Cretobestiola hispanica
 Angarosphex penyalveri
 Cretoserphus gomezi
 Bolbonectus lithographicus
 ?Anaglyphites pluricavus
 Palaeaeschna vidali	
 Hispanochlorogomphus rossi
 Palaeouloborus lacasae	
 Ichthyemidion vivaldi

Correlation

See also 
 List of dinosaur-bearing rock formations
 List of stratigraphic units with few dinosaur genera
 Tremp Formation
 Baltic, Burmese, Dominican, Mexican amber

References

Bibliography

Further reading 
 A. P. Rasnitsyn and J. Ansorge. 2000. Two new Lower Cretaceous hymenopterous insects (Insecta: Hymenoptera) from Sierra del Montsec, Spain. Acta Geológica Hispánica 35:59-64
 X. Martínez-Delclòs. 1993. Blátidos (Insecta, Blattodea) del Cretácico Inferior de España. Familias Mesoblattinidae, Blattulidae y Poliphagidae. Boletín Geológico y Minero 104:516-538
 X. Martínez-Delclòs. 1990. Insectos del Cretácico inferior de Santa Maria de Meià (Lleida): colleción Lluís Marià Vidal i Carreras. Treballs del Museu de Geologia de Barcelona 1:91-116
 P. E. S. Whalley and E. A. Jarzembowski. 1985. Fossil insects from the Lithographic Limestone Montsech (Late Jurassic-early Cretaceous), Lérida Province, Spain. Bulletin of the British Museum of Natural History (Geology) 38(5):381-412
 J. E. Gomez Pallerola. 1979. Un ave y otras especies fósiles nuevas de la biofacies de Santa María de Meyá (Lérida). Boletín Geológico y Minero 90:333-346

Geologic formations of Spain
Cretaceous Spain
Lower Cretaceous Series of Europe
Barremian Stage
Hauterivian Stage
Valanginian Stage
Berriasian Stage
Limestone formations
Lacustrine deposits
Formations
Paleontology in Spain
Formations
Formations